Nugaal University is a university in Las Anod, Somaliland. It was established in 2004 with the purpose of providing higher education to the residents of Sool , Cayn and Sanaag. The university is taught by teachers from outside the country. The university is a member of the Association of Arab Universities and is funded by the Sool Community.

References

External links
 nugaaluniversity.edu.so

Universities in Somaliland
2004 establishments in Somaliland
Educational institutions established in 2004